The axatse( /ˈɑː.hɑː.tʃeɪˌ/ or /ˈɑː.hɑː.tseɪˌ/) is a West African rattle-like percussion instrument. The axatse is traditionally a dried gourd, wrapped in a beaded net. The axatse originated in Ghana, Togo and in the Volta Region by the Ewe people. The axatse is closely related to the shekere, though the axatse is usually made from a smaller gourd. Axatse usually has a hole on the bottom of the gourd as the Shekere usually has a hole on the top of the gourd, near the stem. These holes are made to remove the seeds and the water from the gourd. This action of removing seeds adds resonance to the gourd and stops the gourd from rotting. The Axatse is traditionally percussed between the hands and upper leg.

References

Gourd musical instruments
African percussion instruments
West African musical instruments
Ghanaian musical instruments
Togolese music